"Tell Me If You Still Care" is a song by the S.O.S. Band. It is the opening track on the group's fourth studio album On the Rise and was issued as the album's second single. Written and produced by Jimmy Jam and Terry Lewis, the song peaked at #5 on the Billboard Hot Soul Songs in 1983.

Chart positions

Covers and samples
"Tell Me If You Still Care" was covered by: 
Monica in 1995 for her debut album, Miss Thang. 
It was also interpolated in the chorus of Scarface's 1997 hit Smile, as well as the 2013 song "Smile" by gospel artist Kirk Franklin. 
Also, the song was interpolated by DJ Jazzy Jeff & The Fresh Prince in their song "I'm Looking for the One (To Be with Me)"
LL Cool J in "Hip-Hop" feat. Terri & Monica
Mariah Carey's "Mr. Dupri Mix" of Always Be My Baby sampled the song, which also features rapper Da Brat and R&B group Xscape.
Janet Jackson in "Call on Me"
Jodeci's 2015 song "Incredible" for their album, The Past, The Present, The Future.
It was sampled by rapper Prince Markie Dee for his song, "All My Love, All the Time", which features R&B singer Joe

References

External links
 
 

1983 singles
Song recordings produced by Jimmy Jam and Terry Lewis
Songs written by Jimmy Jam and Terry Lewis
The S.O.S. Band songs
Tabu Records singles
Contemporary R&B ballads
1982 songs
1980s ballads